Panasonic Lumix DMC-SZ3 is a digital camera by Panasonic Lumix. The highest-resolution pictures it records is 16.6 megapixels, through its 25mm Wide-Angle Leica DC VARIO-ELMAR.

Property
10x optical zoom
capture HD video
12 in-camera creative effects

References

External links
DMC-SZ3K on shop.panasonic.com
DMC-SZ3W on shop.panasonic.com
DMC-SZ3V on shop.panasonic.com
Panasonic debuts DMC-SZ3 budget compact superzoom

Point-and-shoot cameras
SZ3